Philip Vincent Belloc Jebb (15 March 1927 - 7 April 1995), was a British architect and Liberal Party politician.

Background
Jebb was the son of Reginald Jebb and Eleanor Belloc. He was a grandson of the writer and Liberal MP Hilaire Belloc. He was also a grandson of the civil engineer George Robert Jebb. He was educated at Downside School and King's College, Cambridge. In 1955 he married Lucy Margaret Pollen, sister of the architect Francis Pollen. They had two sons and two daughters. His brother Anthony became a monk of the Benedictine order at Downside Abbey, taking the name Dom Philip Jebb.

Professional career
Following National service, Jebb read architecture at Cambridge, qualified as an architect and eventually went into private practice. In 1967-70 he enlarged Abbey House, adjacent to Audley End House, to three times its former size for the Hon. Robin Neville. Around 1967 he aided portrait painter Dominick Elwes in the design of a Mediterranean-style apartment complex in Andalucia, Spain, which was completed in 1970. In 1971, Jebb designed a restaurant for Winston Churchill's house, Chartwell, on behalf of the National Trust.  In the early 1980s he designed Government House on Lundy Island, which is now available to rent for holidays through the Landmark Trust. The renovation and remodelling of country houses, and the addition of features necessary for their opening to the public, was a Jebb speciality. The Dowager Duchess of Devonshire spoke highly of his public lavatories at Chatsworth House.

Political career
Jebb came forward as a last-minute Liberal candidate for the new Central division of Norfolk at the 1950 General Election. The seat included much of the old Norfolk East constituency which had been represented by the former Liberal, Frank Medlicott, who had not been opposed by an official Liberal candidate before.  Jebb was defeated into third place and did not stand for parliament again.

External links 
Philip Jebb architect
The Independent obituary

References

1927 births
1995 deaths
Liberal Party (UK) parliamentary candidates
20th-century English architects
Alumni of King's College, Cambridge
People educated at Downside School